Mozier may refer to:

Joseph Mozier (1812–1870), American sculptor
Mozier Landing, Illinois, an unincorporated community in Calhoun County, Illinois, US
Mozier, Illinois, also known as Baytown, an unincorporated community in Calhoun County